Latin Pop Airplay is a chart published by Billboard magazine that ranks the top-performing songs (regardless of genre or language) on Latin pop radio stations in the United States, based on weekly airplay data compiled by Nielsen's Broadcast Data Systems. It is a subchart of Hot Latin Songs, which lists the best-performing Spanish-language songs in the country. In 1999, 15 songs topped the chart, in 52 issues of the magazine.

The first number one of the year was "Dejaría Todo" by Chayanne, which had been in the top spot since the issue dated December 12, 1998; it spent a final total of seven weeks at this position and was named the best-performing Latin pop song of the year". 1999 was named the year of the "Latin Pop Explosion" due to the crossover appeal of Latin artists to the American public. Ricky Martin's performance of "The Cup of Life" at the 41st Annual Grammy Awards on February 24, 1999, was said to be a "game-changer for Latin music worldwide" according to Billboards Leila Cobo. The popularity of Martin's performance was followed by the release of his song, "Livin' la Vida Loca", which became an international success by reaching number one in more than 20 countries. The Spanish-language rendition of the song was released to Latin radio stations in the US, and was the longest-running number one of the year with ten weeks. Martin also achieved his fourth chart-topper with "Bella", the Spanish-language version of "She's All I Ever Had".

Aside from Martin, Enrique Iglesias and Marc Anthony also contributed to Latin pop's popularity with "Bailamos" and "I Need to Know", respectively. "Bailamos", a Spanglish song, simultaneously topped both the Billboard Hot 100 and the Latin Pop Airplay charts, spending six weeks at number one on the latter chart. Iglesias also had the most chart-toppers in 1999, also reaching number one with two other songs, "Nunca Te Olvidaré" and "Ritmo Total", the latter a Spanish-language version of "Rhythm Divine" which was the final number one of the year. "I Need to Know" was recorded in Spanish as "Dímelo", and became Marc Anthony's first chart-topper. 

Other acts to reach number one for the first time include MDO, Millie Corretjer (credited as Millie), and Jaci Velasquez. Corretjer was the only female artist to have more than one chart-topper with "Una Voz en el Alma" and "De Hoy en Adelante". Velasquez had previously established herself as a popular Contemporary Christian music singer before crossing over to the Spanish-language market with her studio album, Llegar a Ti (1999).

Chart history

References

United States Latin Pop Airplay
1999
1999 in Latin music